It's OK or It's Okay may refer to:

 It's OK! (band), American band
 "It's OK!" (Atomic Kitten song)
 "It's O.K." (The Beach Boys song)
 "It's OK" (CeeLo Green song)
 "It's OK" (Delirious? song)
 "It's Okay" (Des'ree song)
 "It's Okay" (One Blood), a song by The Game
 "It's OK", a song by Alexander O'Neal from Saga of a Married Man
 "It's OK", a song by Alvin and the Chipmunks
 "It's OK", a song by Dead Moon
 "It's OK", a song by Imagine Dragons from Mercury – Act 1
 "It's OK", a 2020 song by Nightbirde
 "It's O.K.", a song by BeBe & CeCe Winans from the 1991 album Different Lifestyles
 "It's Okayyy", a 2018 song by Swizz Beatz